Ulotrichales is an order of green algae in the class Ulvophyceae.

Genera unplaced to family (incertae sedis):
Trichosarcina

Families

 Binucleariaceae
 Collinsiellaceae
 Gayraliaceae
 Gloeotilaceae
 Gomontiaceae
 Hazeniaceae
 Helicodictyaceae
 Kraftionemaceae
 Monostromataceae
 Planophilaceae
 Sarcinofilaceae
 Tupiellaceae
 Ulotrichaceae

References

 
Chlorophyta orders